American singer Beyoncé headlined the 2018 Coachella Valley Music and Arts Festival, performing on April 14 and 21 at the Empire Polo Club in Indio, California. Beyoncé was the first Black woman to headline the festival and her performance immediately received widespread critical acclaim. Many in the media described the show as "historic," while The New York Times proclaimed it as "meaningful, absorbing, forceful and radical." The performance was nicknamed "Beychella" by fans.

Her performances paid tribute to the culture of historically black colleges and universities, featuring a full marching band and majorette dancers, while incorporating various aspects of black Greek life, such as a step show along with strolling by pledges. The performances were also influenced by black feminism, sampling black authors and featuring on-stage appearances by fellow Destiny's Child members Kelly Rowland and Michelle Williams, her husband Jay-Z, and her sister Solange Knowles.

The performances were recorded and released as a Netflix-original concert film, Homecoming, on April 17, 2019, accompanied by a live album. Homecoming likewise received widespread critical acclaim and has been named as one of the greatest concert films of all time.

Background 
On January 4, 2017, Beyoncé was announced as a headlining act for the April 2017 Coachella festival. However, on February 23, 2017, she postponed her performance until the following year, due to doctor's concerns regarding her pregnancy with twins (born in June 2017). The secondary (resale) market for tickets to the festival that year fell 12% after the announcement she was postponing.

Playing her rescheduled dates in 2018, Beyoncé became the first black woman ever to headline the festival. In its nearly twenty years of existence, the festival has only had two other women solo headliners, Lady Gaga (who replaced Beyoncé in 2017) and Björk (2002 and 2007).

Even prior to Beyoncé's performance, the nickname "Beychella" emerged for the 2018 festival. Tina Lawson, mother of Beyoncé and Solange Knowles, later said that prior to the show, she had expressed reservations about the performance Beyoncé had planned, worried that the largely white audience at Coachella might not understand  a show so steeped in black culture, particularly black college culture. Lawson recounted that Beyoncé replied saying that given the platform she had achieved in her career, she felt "a responsibility to do what's best for the world and not what is most popular."

Synopsis 
For her April 14, 2018, performance, some 100 dancers as well as her sister Solange, her husband Jay-Z, and her former girl group Destiny's Child joined Beyoncé on stage. On Weekend 2, she was joined by J Balvin for "Mi Gente" in which his verse was sung first; on the Netflix documentary Homecoming, his part has been omitted. She played a 26-song set to 125,000 concert-goers in attendance including Bajan singer Rihanna as well as millions watching via the live-stream on YouTube and subsequent playback. The set sampled Malcolm X and Nina Simone among others. Beyoncé wore five different costumes through the two-hour performance, designed with Olivier Rousteing of French fashion house Balmain.

Musical style 
Writing in The New Yorker, Doreen St. Félix described the musical style of the performance as an "education in black expression [... and] musical history – a mélange of New Orleans and its horns, Houston and its chopped and screwed beats, Brooklyn and its rap velocity, Kingston and its dancehall, and Nigeria and the legacy of its dissenter, Fela Kuti [...] underscoring not only [Beyoncé's] Southernness but the global  Black vernacular that continues to shape her." Near the beginning of the set, Beyoncé sang "Lift Every Voice and Sing," colloquially known as the "Black national anthem". The Wiz, one of Motown's most notable motion pictures, was also sampled in the horn arrangement that heralded Beyoncé's return to the stage after her first costume change.

Themes

Historically black colleges and universities (HBCU) 
The performance has been credited as paying a strong tribute to the HBCU experience. A full African-American marching band played during much of the set, accompanied by majorette dancers. Writing for Mic.com,  Natelegé Whaley stated that the band consisted of members from various HBCUs and played samples of songs that are often played at an HBCU such as "Swag Surf", "Broccoli", and "Back That Thang Up", along with samples of gospel and go-go music. Journalists also noted that the set incorporated various aspects of black Greek life, such as a step show along with strolling by neophytes (also known as pledges). School Daze, a notable Spike Lee film, is also referenced. Beyoncé's first outfit was a yellow sweatshirt with the Greek letters ΒΔΚ which reads Beta Delta Kappa. Later, she came out in a shirt with a shield designed with Nefertiti, Black Panther, black power fist along with a bee, which outlets such as The Washington Post credited as a reference to the shields each black fraternity and sorority have signifying the important values of the particular fraternity and sorority.

Following the show, Beyoncé announced the expansion of her HBCU scholarship fund, BeyGOOD Initiative's Homecoming Scholars Award program (previously known as the Formation Scholars Award program, announced on the one-year anniversary of Lemonade). In the program's second year, it will support one student at each of eight HBCUs: Texas Southern University, Morehouse College, Fisk University, Grambling State University, Xavier University of Louisiana, Wilberforce University, Tuskegee University and Bethune-Cookman University.

Black feminism 
Reviewers noted the influence of black feminism on Beyoncé's performance, including her sampling of Nigerian author Chimamanda Ngozi Adichie's TED Talk on feminism and the appearances on stage of former collaborators Kelly Rowland and Michelle Williams of Destiny's Child well as her sister Solange; writing in Cosmopolitan, Brittney Cooper read Beyoncé's decision to involve these black women in the landmark performance as a gesture of sisterhood.

Critical response 
The performance received broad and overwhelming critical acclaim. In The New York Times, music critic Jon Caramanica wrote: "There's not likely to be a more meaningful, absorbing, forceful and radical performance by an American musician this year, or any year soon, than Beyoncé's headlining set" at the festival. "It was rich with history, potently political and visually grand. By turns uproarious, rowdy, and lush. A gobsmacking marvel of choreography and musical direction." In Variety, Chris Willman wrote, "The show served as testament...to Beyoncé as the premier musical performer of our time." The Washington Post, CNN, NBC, Entertainment Weekly, and Billboard all described the performance as "historic".

Impact 
Following the performance, Destiny's Child sales boosted by 767% and Beyoncé's by 228%, with Lemonade returning to number one on the worldwide iTunes chart, where it remained for two days. "Everybody Mad" saw a boost in sales and streams and went viral, inspiring others to do the dance. Beyoncé's custom Balmain outfit during her performances, most notably the yellow and pink Homecoming hoodie, resulted in a 58% increase in searches for Balmain hoodies after her performance. English singer Rita Ora said that she was inspired by Beyoncé's performance when trying to perfect her own performances, calling it the "real deal" and saying "When I watched that, I completely got it." English rapper Stormzy said he "scrapped" his Wireless Festival performance after seeing Beyoncé's performance, saying "if that's what Beyoncé's doing, yo, we've got to buckle up our ideas over here." Footage from the performance featured in Google's 2020 'Most Searched: A Celebration of Black History Makers' ad as the most searched performance.

Tyler Perry paid homage to the performance and the documentary in his 2022 Netflix film A Madea Homecoming.

Viewership 
Beyoncé's performance garnered 458,000 simultaneous viewers to become the festival's most viewed performance to date and the most viewed live streamed performance of all time, with the entire performance having 41 million total viewers from around the world, 75% more than the previous year.

Coachella
Randy Phillips, the president and chief executive of concert promoter LiveStyle and the former CEO of  Anschutz Entertainment Group Live credited Beyoncé as the start of a change at Coachella towards pop music.

Beyoncé was the first black woman to headline Coachella, and was set to be the second woman to headline ever, the first in a decade, until she dropped out due to her pregnancy.  Vogue credited Beyoncé as "(setting) the stage for a new era of female domination" at the festival.

At the 2019 Coachella festival, Beyoncé's pyramid stage was displayed. A new runway segment was added to the main stage similar to the runway from Beyoncé's performance, which had originally been designed for The Formation World Tour.

Set list 
The following songs were performed during both sets.

 "Welcome" 
 "Crazy in Love" 
 "Freedom"
 "Lift Every Voice and Sing"
 "Formation"
 "Sorry" 
 "Bow Down" / "I Been On"
 "Drunk in Love" 
 "Diva" 
 "Flawless" / "Feeling Myself"
 "Top Off"
 "7/11"
 "Don't Hurt Yourself" 
 "I Care"
 "Partition"
 "Yoncé"
 "Mi Gente (Remix)" 
 "Baby Boy" / "You Don't Love Me (No, No, No)" / "Hold Up" / "Countdown"  
 "Check on It"
 "Déjà Vu"  
 "Run the World (Girls)" 
 "Lose My Breath / "Say My Name" / "Soldier"  
 "Get Me Bodied" 
 "Single Ladies (Put a Ring on It)"
 "Love On Top"

Notes
During the performance of April 21, J Balvin joined Knowles on stage to perform "Mi Gente".

Documentary and live album 
On April 7, 2019, Netflix's Instagram account posted a teaser image, displaying an image of the Homecoming logo on a yellow background. A concert film, titled Homecoming was released on April 17, 2019 as a Netflix-original film. The film contains footage from the two Coachella performances and behind-the-scenes footage documenting the development of the performances, including how Beyoncé had to get in shape after giving birth to twins in 2017.

An accompanying live album, Homecoming: The Live Album was released on the same day on all digital platforms. It contains the full audio live recording and two bonus tracks – a cover of Maze's song "Before I Let Go" and "I Been On". The live album peaked at #4 on the Billboard 200.

References

External links
 Beyoncé's official website

2018 in California
April 2018 events in the United States
Beyoncé concerts